George Alexander Taylor (9 June 1915 – June 1982) was a Scottish football player and coach, who played for Aberdeen and Plymouth Argyle. He appeared for Aberdeen in the Scottish Cup and the Scottish League Cup finals during the 1946–47 season. After retiring as a player in 1952, he joined the Plymouth Argyle coaching staff.

References

External links 

1915 births
1982 deaths
People from Banff and Buchan
Scottish footballers
Association football wing halves
Aberdeen F.C. players
Plymouth Argyle F.C. players
Scottish Football League players
English Football League players
Plymouth Argyle F.C. non-playing staff
Footballers from Aberdeenshire